Perfect Scoundrels is an early-1990s British television comedy-drama following two con-men's travels while conning various people. Produced by TVS Television for the ITV network, it ran for three series between 22 April 1990 and 30 May 1992. The show's main stars were Peter Bowles and Bryan Murray, as well as a cameo appearance from pop singer Lulu.

The series was repeated on The Family Channel but has never been commercially released on DVD. This is possibly due to ongoing rights issues after the production company, TVS, dropped out of the ITV network in 1992 and subsequently went through a number of take-overs. This problem affects the majority of the TVS programme archive as much of the original production paperwork and sales documentation has been lost during the intervening years.

Episodes

Series 1

Series 2

Series 3

References
Timewarp information about Perfect Scoundrels.

External links

1990 British television series debuts
1992 British television series endings
ITV comedy
ITV television dramas
1990s British drama television series
Television shows produced by Television South (TVS)
English-language television shows